Wissler's syndrome is a rheumatic disease that has a similar presentation to sepsis. It is sometimes considered closely related to Still's disease. It is named for Guido Fanconi and Hans Wissler  It was first described by Wissler in 1944 and Fanconi in 1946. Single observations by E. Uhse in 1943 («Febris maculosa intermittens»), Fykow in 1929 and Nowak in 1942.

Signs and symptoms 
A symptom complex characterised by the clinical features of a high intermittent fever of septic type, constantly recurring exanthema, transient arthralgia, carditis, pleurisy, neutrophil leukocytosis, and increased erythrocyte sedimentation rate.

Causes 
Etiology uncertain. Wissler suggested an allergic reaction to bacteraemia as the pathogenic factor.

Diagnosis

Epidemiology 
Children and adolescents are most frequently affected; age in the reported cases varied from 5 to 17 years.

References

External links 

Rheumatology
Syndromes